The 1986 Team Ice Racing World Championship was the eighth edition of the Team World Championship. The final was held on ?, 1986, in Leningrad in the Soviet Union. The Soviet Union won their sixth title.

Classification

See also 
 1986 Individual Ice Speedway World Championship
 1986 Speedway World Team Cup in classic speedway
 1986 Individual Speedway World Championship in classic speedway

References 

Ice speedway competitions
World